Markus Niemelä (born 20 March 1984 in Rauma) is a Finnish former race car driver.  He was the 2008 series champion after winning the final round at Road Atlanta. His international racing career has been volatile due to a number of injuries he has sustained during his career.

Career

Karting
In 1998, Niemelä won the Finnish junior karting championship with maximum points. In 2001, injury of left arm in a snowboarding accident before the start of season prevented participation in the Formula A European/World Championship. He won the one race where he participated, driving practically one-handed against top Finnish karters (ICA).

The following year, Niemelä was the Finnish champion in Formula A. He set the fastest laptime in at least one heat of every European Championship round. He also qualified in World Cup final but technical problems caused a retirement in pre-final and final. In 2003, because of an accident in a European championship race, Niemelä could not drive for three months. He returned for the World Championships to finish fifth.

Single-seaters

2004
Markus became the Finnish and Swedish Champion and the winner of STCC Formula Ford championship. Led Scandinavian Championship before the last round but finished 2nd overall because did not participate on the last round. Nominated as a ”Young Champion” by Finnish ASN. Tested for Formula BMW and was fastest at several unofficial tests.

2005
Markus finished 7th in championship points with one victory and one pole position. Many crashes resulting to damaged car during the season (12 out of 20 races). He was also 5th in UK Formula Renault Winter Championship, 3rd best qualifier of the championship (3rd, 4th, 9th and 3rd in qualifyings). Markus drove Formula Renault first time ever in free practice of first race meeting.

2006
One victory, fastest lap and pole position. Multiple Driver Of The Day Awards - awarded by Renault Sport. Markus finished 7th in the final standings with best positions 1st, 2nd, 3rd, 2x4th.

2007
In Formula Renault Eurocup, he did 6 starts with best result of second at Hungaroring, while in the Asian series, he did 4 starts with 2 wins and one second place. His 3rd win of the 4 races was later penalized from jumping the start. He joined BCN Competicion in the GP2 Series to replace Sakon Yamamoto who moved to F1 during the season.  During his first race, also at the Hungaroring, he was forced to retire when his left shoulder unexpectedly dislocated after 11 laps, which also prevented him from taking part in the second race of the meeting.

2008
In the 2008 season, Niemelä won the Atlantic Championship with Brooks Associates team, after winning the last two rounds of the season.

2009
Niemelä returned to the series to defend his Atlantic Championship title, this time driving for Newman Wachs Racing. He struggled through the first five races failing to score a podium finish. He switched teams to Jensen MotorSport for the remainder of the season, but failed to find any more success and finished 6th in points.

2010
Niemelä started racing Sprint Cars on dirt ovals. The best result of his depute season was 2nd in a VRA race at Ventura Raceway.

2011
Niemelä raced in selected races in different Sprint Car Championships (USAC West Coast, USAC CRA, VRA, USAC Midget) with an average A Main finish of 4.5 over the season. He also scored his first Sprint Car win.

2014
In November 2014, Niemela suffered a severe accident at Perris Auto Speedway in a sprint car, flipping end over end into the catch fence after an axle broke on his car. While he initially was believed to have suffered only a concussion, he later revealed he had suffered severe brain injuries in the accident, resulting in the end of his career.

Racing record

Career summary

Complete GP2 Series results
(key) (Races in bold indicate pole position) (Races in italics indicate fastest lap)

American open–wheel racing results
(key) (Races in bold indicate pole position) (Races in italics indicate fastest lap)

Atlantic Championship

References

External links
Markus Niemelä's official website

Finnish racing drivers
1984 births
Living people
People from Rauma, Finland
GP2 Series drivers
Atlantic Championship drivers
Asian Formula Renault Challenge drivers
British Formula Renault 2.0 drivers
Formula Renault Eurocup drivers
Formula BMW ADAC drivers
Karting World Championship drivers
Sportspeople from Satakunta
Mark Burdett Motorsport drivers
Team Rosberg drivers
Manor Motorsport drivers
Newman Wachs Racing drivers
BVM Racing drivers